Raphitoma columnae is an extinct species of sea snail, a marine gastropod mollusk in the family Raphitomidae.

Description
The length of the shell reaches 23 mm, its diameter 7 mm.

Compared with Raphitoma harpula, the shell is longer, the whorls are less convex, the suture is less impressed. The body whorl is shorter and less depressed on top. The axial ribs are hardly oblique. The transverse striae are uniform and don't form nodules when crossing the ribs. The siphonal canal is straight, shorter and hardly noticed.

Distribution
Fossils of this marine species were found in Miocene strata of Italy.

References

 Scacchi A. 1835. Notizie intorno alle conchiglie ed a' zoofiti fossili che si trovano nelle vicinanze di Gravina in Puglia. Annali Civili del Regno delle Due Sicilie 6: 75-84; 7: 5-18, 2 pl.

External links
 

columnae
Gastropods described in 1835